WACM-LP (94.3 FM, "Footprint Radio") was a low-power FM radio station licensed to serve Auburn, Alabama.  The station was owned by the Auburn Chinese Ministry Association. It aired a Chinese language religious radio music format as part of the "Footprint Radio" broadcasting ministry.

In June 2001, the Auburn Chinese Ministry Association applied to the Federal Communications Commission (FCC) for a construction permit for a new low-power broadcast radio station. The FCC granted this permit on July 13, 2004, with a scheduled expiration date of January 13, 2006. The new station was assigned call sign "WACM-LP" on August 11, 2004. After construction and testing were completed in May 2005, the station was granted its broadcast license on September 30, 2005.

The station's broadcast license was cancelled on December 5, 2011, and its call sign was deleted from the FCC database the same day.

References

External links

Defunct religious radio stations in the United States
ACM-LP
Radio stations established in 2005
Radio stations disestablished in 2011
Defunct radio stations in the United States
ACM-LP
Lee County, Alabama
2005 establishments in Alabama
2011 disestablishments in Alabama
ACM-LP